Aryeh "Lonk" Selinger (born 5 April 1937) is an Israeli volleyball manager and former player. He is widely regarded as one of the greatest volleyball coaches of all time.

Selinger has served as the head coach of the USA Women's Team in the years 1975–1984, a team that would go on to win the Bronze medal in the 1982 World Championship  and the Silver Medal in the 1984 Summer Olympics in Los Angeles, USA. Selinger   won  gold, silver and bronze as a coach in games and championships worldwide, including a Silver Medal for the Men's Team of the Netherlands  at the 1992 Summer Olympics in Barcelona, Spain.

See also
 List of select Jewish volleyball players

References

Jewish volleyball players
Israeli men's volleyball players
Israeli volleyball coaches
Volleyball coaches of international teams
Polish emigrants to Israel
Israeli expatriate sportspeople in the United States
Israeli expatriate sportspeople in the Netherlands
Israeli expatriate sportspeople in Japan
Polish expatriate sportspeople in Japan
Israeli Jews
Sportspeople from Kraków
1937 births
Living people
Medalists at the 1992 Summer Olympics
Medalists at the 1984 Summer Olympics
Olympic silver medalists for the United States in volleyball
Coaches at the 1984 Summer Olympics
Coaches at the 1992 Summer Olympics
Polish expatriate sportspeople in the Netherlands
Polish expatriate sportspeople in the United States
Nazi concentration camp survivors